Noureddine Tadjine (born 10 May 1963) is an Algerian hurdler. He competed in the men's 110 metres hurdles at the 1988 Summer Olympics.

References

External links
 

1963 births
Living people
Athletes (track and field) at the 1988 Summer Olympics
Algerian male hurdlers
Olympic athletes of Algeria
Place of birth missing (living people)
African Games medalists in athletics (track and field)
African Games silver medalists for Algeria
Athletes (track and field) at the 1991 All-Africa Games
21st-century Algerian people
20th-century Algerian people